Charles Richard Green (21 August 1921 – 6 May 2009) was an Australian athlete. He competed in the 110m hurdles at the 1948 Summer Olympics but he failed to advance past the first round in either event. He retired from competitive athletics after the Olympics to begin a long and distinguished career in medicine.

References

1921 births
2009 deaths
Australian male hurdlers
Olympic athletes of Australia
Athletes (track and field) at the 1948 Summer Olympics
20th-century Australian people
21st-century Australian people